Jesus College is a constituent college of the University of Cambridge. The college's full name is The College of the Blessed Virgin Mary, Saint John the Evangelist and the glorious Virgin Saint Radegund, near Cambridge. Its common name comes from the name of its chapel, Jesus Chapel.

Jesus College was established in 1496 on the site of the twelfth-century Benedictine nunnery of St Mary and St Radegund by John Alcock, then Bishop of Ely. The cockerel is the symbol of Jesus College, after the surname of its founder. For the 300 years from 1560 to 1860, Jesus College was primarily a training college for Church of England clergy.

Jesus College has assets of approximately £344m making it Cambridge's fourth-wealthiest college. The college is known for its particularly expansive grounds which include its sporting fields and for its close proximity to its boathouse.

Three members of Jesus College have received a Nobel Prize. Two fellows of the college have been appointed to the International Court of Justice.

Sonita Alleyne was elected master of Jesus College in 2019, 40 years after the college began admitting women as students. She is also the first black leader of an Oxbridge college.

History
When founded in 1496, the College consisted of buildings taken over from the Nunnery of St Mary and St Radegund, which was founded at the beginning of the 12th century; the chapel is the oldest university building in Cambridge still in use and predates the foundation of the college by 350 years, the University by half a century.

The Benedictine Convent, upon dissolution, included the chapel and the cloister attached to it; the nuns' refectory, which became the college hall; and the former lodging of the prioress, which became the Master's Lodge. This set of buildings remains the core of the college to this day and this accounts for its distinctly monastic architectural style, which sets it apart from other Cambridge colleges. A library was soon added, and the chapel was considerably modified and reduced in scale by Alcock. At its foundation, the college had a master, six fellows and six scholars.

Academic profile 
Jesus College admits undergraduate and graduate students to all subjects at the university though typically accepts a larger number of students for engineering, medicine, law, natural sciences, mathematics, economics, history, languages, and human, social and political sciences. The college offers a wide range of scholarships.

The college consistently performs well in the informal Tompkins Table, which ranks Cambridge colleges by undergraduate results. Along with students from Trinity, King's, Christ's and St John's, students of the college have been members of the Cambridge Apostles.

Buildings and grounds

Entrance 
The main entrance to Jesus College is a walled passage known as the "Chimney". The term is derived from the Middle French word cheminée, for "little path" or "little way". The Chimney leads directly to the Porter's Lodge and then into First Court. All the courts at the college, with the exception of the cloister, are open on at least one side.

Libraries

Quincentenary Library 

The Quincentenary Library is the main library of Jesus College and is open 24 hours a day. The library was designed by Eldred Evans and David Shalev in commemoration of the 500th anniversary of the foundation of the college in 1996. Completion of the library was shortly followed by a new accommodation building in 2000, now known as Library Court. The Quincentenary Library has a particularly large law collection, housed in a law library on the ground floor.

Old Library 
The Old Library was in regular use until 1912. It still contains over 9,000 books and is available to private researchers upon appointment. The Old Library includes the Malthus Collection, being the family collection of alumnus Thomas Malthus, famous for his study An Essay on the Principle of Population which influenced Charles Darwin.

College grounds 
Jesus College has large sporting grounds on-site. These include football, rugby, cricket, tennis, squash, basketball and hockey pitches. The Jesus College Boat House is 400 yards away, across Midsummer Common.

The college frequently hosts exhibitions of sculpture by contemporary artists. It has hosted work by Sir Antony Gormley, Sir Eduardo Paolozzi, and Barry Flanagan. The college grounds also include a nature trail, inspired by poetry composed by Samuel Taylor Coleridge during his time as a student.

Jesus College is one of the few colleges to allow anyone to walk on the lawns of its courts, with the exception of First Court, Cloister Court and those that are burial sites for deceased nuns from the original nunnery.

Chapel and choir

Chapel 

The College Chapel was founded in 1157 and took until 1245 to complete, and is believed to be the oldest university building in Cambridge still in use. Originally it was the chapel of the Benedictine Convent of St Mary and St Radegund, which was dissolved by Bishop John Alcock.

The original structure of the chapel was cruciform in shape and the nave had both north and south aisles. A high, pitched roof was surmounted by a belfry and steeple; this collapsed in 1277. The chapel was also used as the parish church of St Radegund. Twice the chapel was ravaged by fire, in 1313 and 1376.

When the college took over the precincts during the 15th century, the parish was renamed after the college as Jesus parish, with the churchyard still being used for burials. This, however, was short-lived, as by the middle of the 16th century Jesus' parish was absorbed into that of All Saints. Significant alterations were carried out to the church under Alcock, transforming the cathedral-sized church, which was the largest in Cambridge into a College chapel for a small group of scholars. A large part of the original nave was replaced by College rooms, and subsequently part of the Master's Lodge.

The misericords were created by the architect Augustus Pugin between 1849 and 1853. Pugin used fragments of the misericords dating from 1500, which had been preserved in the Master's Lodge as templates. Repairs were also undertaken by George Frederick Bodley between 1864 and 1867, who commissioned decorative schemes from Morris, Marshall, Faulkner & Co. The same firm returned in the 1870s to install stained glass.

Said and sung services are held every day during the term. Choral Evensong take place four times a week (Tuesdays, Thursdays, Saturdays, and Sundays), and is sung Eucharist on Sunday mornings. There are also Compline twice a term, as well as Masses on major holy days. The chapel, famed for its warm but clean acoustics, is also much sought-after space for concerts and recitals, as well as recordings.

Choir 
Jesus College maintains two highly regarded choirs, the College Choir and the Chapel Choir.
 The College Choir consists of male and female students and sings regular services twice a week in the chapel. One of the leading choirs in Cambridge, its singers are mainly drawn from the college's own students, but also include singers from a number of other colleges. Evensong is sung by the College Choir on Tuesdays at 6.30 pm and Sundays at 6.00 pm during Full Term; Sunday Eucharists are sung by a consort of singers from the College Choir.
The Chapel Choir, which is likely to have existed since the foundation of the college, consists of around 20 younger choristers combined with the lower voices of the College Choir and also sings services twice a week in the chapel. It is unique among Cambridge college choirs in that the choristers are volunteers: that is, they are drawn from schools around the city and do not attend a particular choir school. The Chapel Choir sings Evensong on Thursdays and Saturdays at 6.30 pm.

Until December 2016, Mark Williams, former assistant organist at St Paul's Cathedral had been the Director of Music since September 2009; Richard Pinel, former assistant organist at St George's Chapel, Windsor and Organ Scholar at Magdalen College, Oxford, was the Director of Music. until the end of 2022, where he gave his position to Peter Wright, so took on the role as acting Director of Music whilst they were looking for someone permanent. Currently, Benjamin Sheen is the newly appointer Director of Music. Former Organ Scholars include Malcolm Archer, who (until 2018) was the Organist and Director of Chapel Music, Winchester College, James O'Donnell, Organist and Master of the Choristers of Westminster Abbey, and Charles Harrison, Organist and Master of the Choristers of Chichester Cathedral.,

College grace

Before dinner 
The following Latin grace is recited before formal dinners at Jesus College (Oratio Ante Cibum; English: "Prayer before Food"):

Oculi omnium in te aspiciunt et in te sperant, Deus. Tu das illis escam tempore opportuno. Aperis tu manus, et imples omne animal benedictione tua. Benedic nobis, Domine, et omnibus tuis donis, quae ex larga liberalitate tua sumpturi sumus, per Jesum Christum Dominum nostrum. Deus est caritas. Qui manet in caritate manet in Deo et Deus in illo. Sit Deus in nobis, et nos maneamus in illo.

English translation:

The eyes of all look towards you and trust in you, O God. You give them food in due season. You open your hands and fill every living thing with your blessing. Bless us, O Lord, and all your gifts, which through your great generosity we are about to receive, through Jesus Christ our Lord. God is love. He who abides in love abides in God and God in him. May God be in us and may we abide in him.

After dinner 
The following Oratio Post Cibum (English: "Prayer after Food") is sometimes read after dinner:

Deus pacis et dilectionis semper maneat nobiscum; tu autem, Domine, miserere nostrum. Agimus tibi gratias pro omnibus tuis beneficiis, qui vivis et regnas, Deus, per omnia saecula saeculorum. Deus conservet Ecclesiam, Reginam, regnum, senatum, et pacem.

English translation:

May the God of peace and love always abide with us; have mercy upon us, O Lord. We thank you for all your mercies, who live and reign, God, forever and ever. May God preserve the Church, the Queen, the realm, Parliament and peace.

However, after a normal formal dinner in Hall the following short responsory is usually used:
 The Presiding Fellow: Laus Deo (Praise be to God)
 The college: Deo Gratias (Thanks be to God)

Student life

Student societies 
Although Jesus College is one of the older colleges at the university, it is known for having a relaxed and informal atmosphere. This is in large part attributable to its active student unions, the Jesus College Student Union (JCSU) and the Jesus College Graduate Union (MCR). These unions organise a wide range of social, cultural, welfare and sporting events throughout the year. The John Hughes Arts Festival, founded by College students in 2014 in memory of the late Dean of Chapel, John Hughes, enters its third year in 2017, providing a broad programme of arts events.

Jesus College hosts an annual May Ball. Musician James Bay played at the 2015 May Ball. The headliners for 2016 were Coasts, Clean Bandit and Jack Garratt.

Sport 
Jesus College offers a large number of sports, including rowing, football, rugby, hockey, tennis, squash and basketball. The college typically fields a number of teams in each sport. The Jesus College Boat Club is particularly strong, with the 1st Men's VIII never having dropped below 12th place in the May Bumps and 11th position in the Lent Bumps. The JCBC organises the annual Fairbairn Cup Races.

Hall 
A three-course dinner known as Formal Hall is served in the college's main dining hall five nights a week. Gowns are worn by all members of the college, along with lounge suits for men and formal dresses for women. A four-course dinner for graduate students of the college known as Grad Hall is served in Upper Hall each Wednesday. Unlike most traditional Oxbridge colleges, the college allows graduate students to dine at High Table on Tuesdays.

The college also offers informal dining at lunch and dinner known as Caff, as well as brunch on Saturday mornings and a carvery lunch on Sundays. The college also has a popular student bar known as JBar which sells a wide variety of drinks, including JPA (Jesus Pale Ale).

Masters and fellows

Masters of the college 

Sonita Alleyne was elected master of the college in 2019. She was preceded by Ian White, former Van Eck Professor of Engineering at the university. Previous masters of the college include:
 Robert Mair (2001–2011), former Sir Kirby Laing Professor of Civil Engineering at the university;
 Professor David Crighton (1997–2000), former Professor of Applied Mathematics at the university;
 Baron Renfrew of Kaimsthorn (1986–1996), former Disney Professor of Archaeology at the university;
 Sir Alan Cottrell (1973–1986), former Goldsmiths' Professor of Materials Science and later Chief Scientific Adviser to the Prime Minister; and
 Sir Denys Page (1959–1973), former Regius Professor of Greek and President of the British Academy.

Fellows of the college 
Three members of the college have received Nobel Prizes. Philip W. Anderson was awarded the Nobel Prize in Physics (1977). Anderson was a fellow from 1969 to 1975 while he held a visiting professorship at the Cavendish Laboratory and has been an Honourary Fellow since 1978. Peter D. Mitchell, an undergraduate and later research student, was awarded the Nobel Prize in Chemistry (1978). He became an Honourary Fellow in 1979. Eric Maskin was a joint winner of the Nobel Prize in Economics in 2007. Maskin was a research fellow from 1976 to 1977 and has been an Honourary Fellow since 2009.

Several prominent figures in the law have been fellows of the college. Professor Glanville Williams, described as Britain's foremost scholar of criminal law, was a Fellow from 1957 to 1978. The Glanville Williams Society, consisting of current and former members of Jesus College, meets annually in his honour. Justice David Hayton, editor of Underhill and Hayton's Law of Trusts and Trustees and current judge of the Caribbean Court of Justice was a Fellow from 1973 to 1987. Professor Robert Jennings was a Fellow of the college and later Whewhell Professor of International Law (1955–1982) before his appointment to the International Court of Justice (ICJ), where he served as a Judge (1982–1991) and later as President (1991–1995). Professor James Crawford was also a Fellow of the college and later Whewhell Professor of International Law (1992–2014) before his appointment to the International Court of Justice in November 2014. Current Honourary Fellows include Lord Roger Toulson of the Supreme Court of the United Kingdom, Sir Rupert Jackson of the Court of Appeal, and Sir Colman Treacy, also of the Court of Appeal, all of whom were students of the college.

Notable alumni

See also
Colleges at the University of Cambridge
List of Masters of Jesus College, Cambridge
List of organ scholars at British Universities
Jesus College, Oxford sister college at Oxford
Okukor, a Benin bronze 
Tobias Rustat

References

External links

Jesus College website
Jesus College Student Union website
Jesus College Graduate Union website

 
1496 establishments in England
Organisations based in Cambridge with royal patronage
Colleges of the University of Cambridge
Grade I listed buildings in Cambridge
Grade I listed educational buildings
Educational institutions established in the 15th century